Last Stand at Saber River is a 1997 American Western television film directed by Dick Lowry and starring Tom Selleck, Suzy Amis, Haley Joel Osment, Keith Carradine, David Carradine, Tracey Needham, David Dukes and Harry Carey Jr. Based on the 1959 novel of the same title by Elmore Leonard, the film is about a Civil War Confederate veteran who tries to put the pieces of his life back together but finds himself fighting a new battle on the frontier. Seeking to reclaim his Arizona homestead from rebel pioneers who sympathize with the Union war effort, he joins forces with his Union adversary to make a last stand for the one thing worth fighting for, his family. In 1997, Osment won a YoungStar Award for Best Performance by a Young Actor in a Made For TV Movie. In 1998, the film received the Western Heritage Awards Bronze Wrangler for Television Feature Film.

Plot
As America recovers from the Civil War, Paul Cable (Tom Selleck) returns home to Texas after being away from his family for years while fighting for the Confederacy. His wife, Martha (Suzy Amis), is a strong-willed frontier woman whose independence makes her a force in and of herself. She had been told that he was killed in action. Upon her husband's unexpected return, she once again devotes herself to being his wife, but resents him for having left her and their children behind to fight a war she didn't care to understand.

Despite having loved each other since childhood and being married, Paul and Martha are now like strangers to each other, and the tension between them is evident. During his absence, their youngest daughter died from a fever, and Martha, having borne that without him, has developed a hatred for her husband. Her father, James Sanford (Harry Carey Jr.), scolds her for her attitude toward Cable, but she stands her ground, never backing down from her stance on the subject. Her father knows her well and subsequently leaves the subject alone.

Cable decides he will return to Arizona and reclaim the ranch he owns there. The family members, consisting of Paul, Martha, and their daughter and son, load up their belongings, bid farewell to Martha's father, and make their way to Arizona. While en route, they come into contact with Lorraine Kidston (Tracey Needham), the beautiful ramrod cowgirl daughter of rancher Duane Kidston (David Carradine). During the night, horses headed by her men accidentally stampede through the Cables' camp, leading Paul and Martha to scold the men. Lorraine agrees that her men were foolish to run the horses at night, and scolds them. Through this interaction, the cowhands and Lorraine learn that the man in front of them is, in fact, Paul Cable. They had been told that he was dead, and since then, her father has assumed control of Cable's ranch.

Lorraine's father, Duane Kidston, is a former Union Army soldier, as is his brother Vern (Keith Carradine). They have little use for former Confederates and feel that Cable's ranch now belongs to them. Upon reaching the ranch, Cable confronts the Kidston men staying in his house. However, when one man attempts to draw on Cable, he is shot and killed by Martha Cable, who is in the dark shadows.

The shooting leads to an ongoing feud between Paul Cable and the Kidston men, during which several of Kidston's hired guns are killed by Cable. Vern and Lorraine Kidston, however, begin to sympathize with the Cables, feeling it is better to simply return the ranch to them and let things be. Duane disagrees but relents to his daughter and brother's wishes. In the end, the real threat to the Cables' new life in Arizona does not come from the Kidstons, but from a one-armed Confederate sympathizer and former soldier, Edward Janroe (David Dukes), who kills Duane, an event for which Cable is blamed.

Despite everything pointing to Cable as Duane's killer, not even Duane's brother Vern believes it. Janroe kidnaps Cable's daughter as security during an illegal gun transaction with Mexican bandits. Cable and Vern team up and chase down Janroe, killing him, then get involved in a shootout with the bandits. Cable eventually asks Vern to take his daughter out of harm's way, which Vern does. Cable then takes on the remaining bandits alone, with them eventually just deciding to take the guns from Janroe's wrecked wagon and leave.

Cable returns home wounded, where he is nursed by Martha, who has finally learned to accept him as he is. She decides to forgive him, forget all the animosity between them, and love her husband again.

Cast
Tom Selleck as Paul Cable
Suzy Amis as Martha Cable
David Dukes as Edward Janroe
Rachel Duncan as Clare Cable
Haley Joel Osment as Davis Cable
Keith Carradine as Vern Kidston
David Carradine as Duane Kidston
Tracey Needham as Lorraine Kidston
Chris Stacy as Chris
Harry Carey Jr. as James Sanford
Patrick Kilpatrick as Austin Dodd
Rex Linn as Bill Dancy
Eugene Osment as Wynn Dodd
Denis Forest as Cornet
Lumi Cavazos as Luz
Raymond Cruz as Manuel

Production

Filming locations
Bonanza Creek Ranch, 15 Bonanza Creek Lane, Santa Fe, New Mexico, USA 
Charles R Ranch, County Road 24, Las Vegas, New Mexico, USA 
Las Vegas, New Mexico, USA 
Santa Clara Pueblo, New Mexico, USA 
Valle Grande, New Mexico, USA

Reception

Awards and nominations
1997 YoungStar Awards for Best Performance by a Young Actor in a Made For TV Movie (Haley Joel Osment)
1998 Western Heritage Awards Bronze Wrangler for Television Feature Film

References

External links

1997 television films
1997 films
American Western (genre) television films
1990s political drama films
American political drama films
TNT Network original films
Films set in the 1860s
Films based on works by Elmore Leonard
American novels adapted into films
Films directed by Dick Lowry
Films scored by David Shire
American drama television films
1990s English-language films
1990s American films
1997 Western (genre) films